Lake Florida is a lake in Kandiyohi County, in the U.S. state of Minnesota.

According to Warren Upham, Lake Florida was said to have been named by early settlers for its "location to the south".

See also
List of lakes in Minnesota

References

Lakes of Minnesota
Lakes of Kandiyohi County, Minnesota